Siphonops leucoderus, the Salvador caecilian, is a species of caecilian in the family Siphonopidae. It is endemic to eastern Brazil and only known from its type locality, the Bahia state (more precise location is unknown). It is assumed to be a subterranean species, possibly living in lowland moist forest.

References

leucoderus
Endemic fauna of Brazil
Amphibians of Brazil
Amphibians described in 1968
Taxonomy articles created by Polbot